Robert Munroe (1712April 19, 1775) was a soldier from Cambridge Farm, later Lexington, Massachusetts, notable as the third-highest ranking militia officer in the action at Lexington in the Battles of Lexington and Concord, one of the first eight Patriot casualties in that conflict, and the first officer killed. At the time of his death, he was a militia ensign, now primarily a naval rank in English-speaking countries, but formerly the lowest rank of infantry officer in both the British and United States armies.

References

1712 births
1775 deaths
United States military personnel killed in the American Revolutionary War